Count Franz Philipp von Lamberg ( gróf, 30 November 179128 September 1848) was an Austrian soldier and statesman, who held the military rank of field marshal (German: Feldmarschallleutnant). He had a short but important role in the Hungarian Revolution of 1848.

Early life and ancestry 
He was born into the House of Lamberg, which originated in Carinthia, Austria. Franz Philip was the eldest son of Count Philip Joseph von Lamberg (1748–1807), Imperial and Royal Chamberlain and landowner and his wife, born Baroness Borbála Luzsénszky de Luzsna and Reglicze (1771–1843). His maternal grandfather, Baron György Luzsénszky (1721–1773) was owner of extensive lands in Hungary.

Life 
Lamberg was born in Mór, Hungary on 30 November 1791. He entered into service in the Austro-Hungarian Army (German: Landstreitkräfte Österreich-Ungarns) in 1810, aged 18 or 19. He was promoted to the rank of major general (German: Generalmajor) in 1834 and to the rank of field marshal (German: Feldmarchall) in 1842. He became the Chief of Staff of the imperial and royal forces stationed in Hungary in 1834. 

Aside from his military career, Lamberg also worked as a journalist and writer. His first publications were in the newspaper Hírnök ("Messenger" in Hungarian) in Pozsony (Bratislava, Slovakia), and he wrote multiple books in both German and Hungarian, the most well-known being Another Terra Incognita. Knowledge and Facts About the Non-Hungarian Domains of the Austrian Empire (Még egy Terra Incognita. Ismeretek 's tudnivalók az ausztriai birodalom nem magyar tartományairól), published in 1841 in Pozsony. In 1844, he was considered for a membership in the Hungarian Academy of Sciences.

Role in the Hungarian Revolution of 1848 
In 1848, Lamberg was the commander of the Pozsony division of the Hungarian General Headquarters (German: k. und k. Generalkommando in Ungarn). When the first independent government of Hungary was formed, and the country was establishing its independent military force, Minister of War Lázár Mészáros asked  Lamberg to join, but he refused. In his memoire, Lázár wrote "[Lamberg] was more of an enemy than a friend of the new constitution (...) he expressed the greatest distaste for it".

On 25 September 1848, the Viennese Court appointed Lamberg as the military commander and provisional palatine of Hungary. The appointment had not been previously signed by the Hungarian minister, so the government deemed it invalid on 27 September. 

Lamberg arrived in Buda on 28 September to get the signature and take his office. He wished to meet Prime Minister Count Lajos Battyhány, who had already left to meet Lamberg at an army base, where he intended to sign the appointment.

While he was crossing the Chain Bridge, an angered mob frustrated by the approaching Croatian army recognised Lamberg, murdered him, mutilated the body and triumphantly carried its pieces around, impaled on scythes.

Lamberg's death proved a turning point for the revolution, killing all hopes of a peaceful solution. It was one of the reasons for King Ferdinand V to dissolve the Diet of Hungary on 4 October 1848 and appoint Count Josip Jelačić von Bužim, Ban of Croatia and leader of the Croatian army as the military and civil governor of Hungary.

Marriage and issue
Lamberg married Countess Caroline Hoyos von und zu Stichsenstein (1811–1875) on 19 April 1828 in Vienna. She was the daughter of Count John Ernest Hoyos (1779–1859), a wealthy landowner, and Countess Maria Theresia von Schlabrendorf (1781–1862). Together, they had seven children:

 Countess Ernestine von Lamberg (1829–1874), who married Count Antal Szécsen von Temerin (1819–1896), a Hungarian politician and had issue
 Countess Caroline von Lamberg (1830–1883), who married Count Alphons von Wimpffen (1828–1866)
 Count Franz Imre von Lamberg (1832–1901), who married Countess Anna Maria von Lamberg (1837–1897)
 Countess Maria Theresia Charlotte von Lamberg (1833–1876), who married Count Alphons von Mensdorff-Pouilly (1810–1894)
 Countess Theresa von Lamberg (1836–1913), who married Franz, Count of Meran (1839–1891)
 Count Philipp von Lamberg (1838–1874), who married Baroness Marie von Wenckheim (1848–1900)
 Count Heinrik von Lamberg (1841–1838), who served as a general of the cavalry and married Princess Eleonore zu Schwarzenberg (1858–1938)

References 

 
 
 Carl Schurz, Lebenserinnerungen bis zum Jahre 1852, Berlin: Georg Reimer, 1906 and 1911.   Schurz records the death of Lamberg (he spells in “Lemberg”) on pp. 156–157 (Chapter 5).

Austro-Hungarian people
Austrian soldiers
People of the Revolutions of 1848
Franz Philipp
Hungarian nobility
Hungarian people of Austrian descent
Austrian people of Hungarian descent
People from Mór
1791 births
1848 deaths
Austrian Empire military personnel of the Napoleonic Wars